The Acadia University Faculty Association was certified on July 15, 1976, and is the trade union representing the full-time and part-time professors, instructors, and academic librarians and archivists at Acadia University in Nova Scotia. AUFA members have taken strike action three times in their history: in the spring of 2004 and the fall of 2007, during the presidency of Gail Dinter-Gottlieb; and in February 2022 during the presidency of Peter Ricketts. AUFA is a member of the Canadian Association of University Teachers (CAUT).

External links 
AUFA website
CAUT website

Faculty Association
Trade unions in Nova Scotia
Tertiary education trade unions
Trade unions established in 1976